Salamonde Dam is a concrete arch dam on the Cávado River, where the river forms the border line between the districts of Braga and Vila Real. It is located in the municipality Vieira do Minho, in Braga District, Portugal.

The dam was completed in 1953. It is owned by Companhia Portuguesa de Produção de Electricidade (CPPE). The dam was designed by Coyne et Bellier.

Dam
Salamonde Dam is a 75 m tall (height above foundation) and 284 m long arch dam with a crest altitude of 281 m. The volume of the dam is 93,000 m³. The dam features a  spillway with 4 gates over the dam (maximum discharge 1,700 m³/s) and one bottom outlet (maximum discharge 130 m³/s).

Reservoir
At full reservoir level of 280 m (maximum flood level of 280.5 m) the reservoir of the dam has a surface area of 2.42 (2.36) km² and a total capacity of 65 mio. m³; its active capacity is 56.3 (55 or 57) mio. m³. With the 55 mio. m³ water 26.9 GWh can be produced.

Power plant

Salamonde I
The hydroelectric power plant went operational in 1953. It is operated by EDP. The plant has a nameplate capacity of 42 MW. Its average annual generation is 231.2 (175,  232 or 244) GWh.

The power station contains 2 Francis turbine-generators with 21.8 MW (25 MVA) each in an underground powerhouse. The turbine rotation is 428 rpm. The minimum hydraulic head is 78 m, the maximum 125 m. Maximum flow per turbine is 22 m³/s. The turbines and generators were provided by Voith.

Salamonde 2
In 2011 Alstom has been awarded a contract by EDP to install a 207 MW Francis reversible pump turbine and a 244 MVA motor-generator in a new pumped-storage power plant. The new power plant is expected to go operational in August 2015. Its average annual generation is estimated to be 386 GWh.

See also

 List of power stations in Portugal
 List of dams and reservoirs in Portugal

External links

References

Dams in Portugal
Hydroelectric power stations in Portugal
Arch dams
Dams completed in 1953
Energy infrastructure completed in 1953
1953 establishments in Portugal
Buildings and structures in Braga District
Underground power stations
Vieira do Minho
Cávado River